The Last Grenade is a 1970 British war film directed by Gordon Flemyng and starring Stanley Baker and Alex Cord as two soldiers of fortune, formerly comrades, who now find themselves on opposite sides. The cast also includes Richard Attenborough, Honor Blackman, Rafer Johnson, John Thaw, Andrew Keir, and Julian Glover. It was the final feature film directed by Flemyng.

Synopsis
Beginning in the Congo, a group of mercenaries led by British Major Harry Grigsby are due to be picked up by helicopters after completing a mission.  As they board the choppers they are fired on from the helicopters by another group of mercenaries led by American Kip Thompson, who has been hired to change sides.

Recovering in the United Kingdom, Grigsby is recruited by the British government to take out Thompson, who has been hired by Red China to stir up trouble in the New Territories between Hong Kong and Red China. As neither nation wants open warfare with the other, each side hires expendable mercenaries. Grigsby recruits his surviving old crew including Joe Jackson, Terry Mitchell, Gordon Mackenzie, and Andy Royal.

In addition to fighting Thompson, Grigsby finds time to seduce the wife, Katherine, of his liaison, a British General Charles Whiteley.

Cast
 Stanley Baker as Maj. Harry Grigsby
 Alex Cord as Kip Thompson
 Honor Blackman as Katherine Whiteley
 Richard Attenborough as Gen. Charles Whiteley
 Rafer Johnson as Joe Jackson
 Andrew Keir as Gordon Mackenzie
 Ray Brooks as Lt. David Coulson
 Julian Glover as Andy Royal
 John Thaw as Terry Mitchell
 Gerald Sim as Dr. Griffiths
 Philip Latham as Adams 
 A. J. Brown as Governor 
 Pamela Stanley as Governor's Lady
 Paul Dawkins as Commissioner Doyle
 Kenji Takaki as Te Ching

Production
It was one of a series of films produced by Dimitri de Grunwald, who called The Last Grenade'''s commercial prospects "safe-ish". The film was shot at Shepperton Studios and on location in Spain and Hong Kong. The sets were designed by the art director Anthony Pratt.

The film only uses names of the characters from John Sherlock's 1964 novel The Ordeal of Major Grigsby that was set in the Malayan Emergency in 1948. Sherlock co-wrote the original screenplay that was rewritten by James Mitchell. The working title of the film was Grigsby''.

References

External links
 
 

1970 films
British war films
Cold War films
Films set in the Democratic Republic of the Congo
1970s war films
Films directed by Gordon Flemyng
Films shot in Spain
Films shot in Hong Kong
Films set in Hong Kong
Films about mercenaries
Films produced by Dimitri de Grunwald
Films shot at Shepperton Studios
Films scored by John Dankworth
1970s English-language films
1970s British films